Hseiniyeh - Tell Kalba  is a Syrian village located in Abu al-Duhur Nahiyah in Idlib District, Idlib.  According to the Syria Central Bureau of Statistics (CBS), Hseiniyeh - Tell Kalba had a population of 2419 in the 2004 census.

References 

Populated places in Idlib District